This is a list of notable bakers.
 Maria Anna Fisher, 19th-century biscuit entrepreneur
 Paul Hollywood, judge of The Great British Bake Off
 Charles Joughin, chief baker aboard the RMS Titanic
 James William Middleton, baker of theme cakes
 Angelo Motta, Milanese baker famous for the revival of panettone
 Lionel Poilâne, noted for the excellence of his sourdough
 Ragueneau, fictional baker and poet in Edmond Rostand's play Cyrano de Bergerac
Sylvia Weinstock
 Nancy Silverton, founder, La Brea Bakery; James Beard Foundation Outstanding Chef 2014
 Wu Pao-chun, 2010 winner of the Bakery Masters, bread category

See also
 De Echte Bakker
 List of baked goods

References

 
Bakers